Güldenstädt's shrew (Crocidura gueldenstaedtii) is a species of mammal in the family Soricidae. It is sometimes considered a subspecies of the lesser white-toothed shrew (C. suaveolens), but more recent studies support it being a distinct species. It is named after Johann Anton Güldenstädt.

It has a wide range throughout Europe, from Spain west to Russia, and south through the Caucasus to the Middle East, as far south as the Sinai Peninsula in Egypt. Mummified shrews from the beginning of the Ptolemaic Period at Quesna, Egypt, have also been identified to this species, indicating that it once occurred in the Nile Delta, where it no longer does, supporting a moister regional environment at the time.

It contains several subspecies from western Europe and the island of Cyprus that may represent distinct species of their own.

References

External links 
 Insectivore Specialist Group 1996.  Crocidura gueldenstaedtii.   2006 IUCN Red List of Threatened Species.   Downloaded on 30 July 2007.

Crocidura
Taxonomy articles created by Polbot